Claude Godard d'Aucourt called de Saint-Just (14 July 1768 – 17 March 1826) was a French librettist.

Being a younger son, he bore the name st-Just which was a dependent lordship of Plancy. He wrote the librettos of several opéras comiques by François Adrien Boieldieu such as:

1797: L'Heureuse Nouvelle
1797: La Famille suisse
1798: Zoraïme et Zulnar
1799: Emma, ou la Prisonnière
1799: Les Méprises espagnoles
1800: Le calife de Bagdad
1803: L'heureux malgré lui by Étienne Méhul
1806: Gabrielle d'Estrées by E. Méhul
1812: Jean de Paris.

He gave himself the collection of his Œuvres (Paris, 1826, 2 volumes in-8°).

His father had himself given some books of libertine inspiration, including Les Mémoires turcs, avec l'Histoire galante de deux jeunes Turcs durant leur séjour en France (1745), which were very successful, or Thémidore ou Mon histoire et celle de ma maîtresse (1745).

Claude Godard d'Aucourt died in Paris 17 March 1826 and is buried at cimetière du Père-Lachaise (19th division).

External links 
 Jules Moiroux, Le cimetière du Père Lachaise, Paris, S. Mercadier, 1908, read online 
 Claude Godard d'Aucourt de Saint-Just on 
 His plays and their presentations on CÉSAR

Writers from Paris
1768 births
1826 deaths
18th-century French writers
18th-century French male writers
French opera librettists
Burials at Père Lachaise Cemetery